Bachchu is a surname. It may refer to:

Ayub Bachchu (1962–2018), Bangladeshi rock guitarist, composer and singer-songwriter, who was the founder of the Bangladeshi rock band LRB
Bachchu Singh, Indian politician and a member of the Rajasthan Legislative Assembly
Nazmul Huda Bachchu (1938–2017), Bangladeshi film and television actor
Rawshan Ara Bachchu (1932–2019), Bangladeshi activist
Sadek Bachchu (born 1955), Bangladeshi film actor